If I Could Be... is the fifth and most recent album by Meredith Brooks, released in 2007. It is an album of children's music which Brooks states she was inspired to write and record after the birth of her son.

Track listing

References

2007 albums
Meredith Brooks albums
Indie rock albums by American artists
Children's music albums by American artists